Lake Jennie is a somewhat rectangular freshwater lake in the city of Sanford, which is in Seminole County, Florida. Along the northwest, this lake is bordered by Seminole High School. On the southwest is a park. Most of the rest is bordered by commercial properties.

This lake has no public swimming areas or boat docks.

References

Jennie